Jurgen Bardhi (born 6 November 1997) is an Albanian professional footballer who plays as an attacking midfielder for Turkish club Ankara Keçiörengücü.

Club career

Early career
Bardhi started his youth career at age of 13 with his hometown club Iliria in 2011. After spending 3 seasons with Iliria he moved to Partizani.

Partizani
He made his debut with Partizani on 19 November 2014 playing the full 90-minutes match against Lushnja in the Albanian Cup.

International career
Bardhi received his first international call up at the Albania national under-19 football team by coach Arjan Bellaj for two friendly matches against Kosovo U19 on 13 & 15 October 2015. In the first match on 13 October Bardhi played as a starter in a 2–0 loss. Then in the second match Bardhi scored the opening goal which was succeeded by another one by Rubin Hebaj but however Kosovo U19 managed to balance the score in to 2–2.

He was called up at Albania national under-19 football team by coach Arjan Bellaj to participate in the 2016 UEFA European Under-19 Championship qualification from 12–17 November 2015, but since Rey Manaj was called up at the Albania national football team by coach Gianni De Biasi, Bardhi was called up as a replacement for Manaj at the Albania national under-21 football team by coach Redi Jupi for the 2017 UEFA European Under-21 Championship qualification match against Portugal U21 & Liechtenstein U21 on 12 & 16 November 2015.

Following the absence of Fiorin Durmishaj for the 2019 UEFA European Under-21 Championship qualification match against Iceland U21 on 10 October 2017 due to an injury, Bardhi was called up as a replacement by coach Alban Bushi, making his return at the Albania under-21 side after one year.''

Career statistics

Club

References

External links
Jurgen Bardhi profile FSHF.org

1997 births
People from Krujë
Living people
Albanian footballers
Albania youth international footballers
Albania under-21 international footballers
Association football midfielders
FK Partizani Tirana players
Tuzlaspor players
Ankara Keçiörengücü S.K. footballers
Kategoria Superiore players
TFF First League players
Albanian expatriate footballers
Expatriate footballers in Turkey
Albanian expatriate sportspeople in Turkey